USS Philippine Sea (CG-58) is a Flight II Ticonderoga-class guided missile cruiser on active service in the United States Navy. She is named for the Battle of the Philippine Sea during World War II and is the second ship to bear the name. She has completed multiple deployments as part of Operation Enduring Freedom since 2001.

Operational history
Philippine Sea was built by Bath Iron Works in Bath, Maine. Her keel was laid on 8 April 1986 and she was launched on 12 July 1987. Upon completion of her sea-trials after construction, Philippine Sea transferred to the Atlantic Fleet and was commissioned on 18 March 1989 in Portland, Maine.

In 2003, the ship was assigned to Cruiser-Destroyer Group 12.

In 2010, the ship failed her initial Board of Inspection and Survey (INSURV) inspection. On 7 May 2011, Philippine Sea departed Mayport for a scheduled overseas deployment to the U.S. Fifth Fleet and U.S. Sixth Fleet Area of Responsibility. On 3 June 2011, Philippine Sea paid a port visit to Kiel, Germany, prior to participating with the multi-national exercise Baltic Operations 2011 (BALTOPS-2011).  This exercise included naval units from the United States, Russian, Danish, Polish and French navies, and BALTOPS-2011 ended on 21 June 2011. On 6 July 2011, Philippine Sea rescued 26 Filipino crew members from the Marshall Islands-owned, Liberian-flagged supertanker Brillante Virtuoso southwest of Aden, Yemen, after the ship's superstructure was set on fire following a reported attack by pirates using rocket-propelled grenades (RPG).  Philippine Sea transited the Suez Canal on 1 July 2011.

The cremated remains of Neil Armstrong, the first man to walk on the Moon, were buried at sea from the warship on 14 September 2012, in the Atlantic Ocean.

Starting on 23 September 2014, USS Philippine Sea fired Tomahawk missiles in the Persian Gulf at sites in Syria, targeting Islamic State of Iraq and the Levant's command-and-control centers, training camps and weapons depots. The operation was expected to last several hours, with the first explosions from Tomahawk missiles heard near Raqqa in northern Syria. The USS Philippine Sea was part of the  carrier strike group.

Awards
 Joint Meritorious Unit Award - (Nov-Dec 1991)
 Navy Unit Commendation - (Jan-Feb 1991, Sep-Oct 2001, 19 Dec 2013, Jan-Dec 2013)
 Navy Meritorious Unit Commendation - (Jan-Jun 1994, Jan-Aug 2017)
 Battle "E" - (1993, 1994, 2000, 2001, 2012, 2013, 2014, 2017, 2018)
 Southwest Asia Service Medal - (Aug 1990-Feb 1991)
 James F. Chezek Memorial Gunnery Award - (1992)

See also
Carrier Strike Group Two

References

External links
Official web site
USS Philippine Sea webpage

 

Ticonderoga-class cruisers
Ships built in Bath, Maine
1987 ships
Cold War cruisers of the United States
Cruisers of the United States